Anup Kumar is an Indian former professional Kabaddi player and Kabaddi Coach of PKL Team Puneri Paltan. He was a member of the India national kabaddi team that won Asian gold medals in 2010 and 2014, one South Asian gold medal in 2016 and the 2016 Kabaddi World Cup. He was the captain of the Indian National Kabaddi Team. He spent five years with U Mumba and later moved to Jaipur Pink Panthers. In 2012, the Government of India conferred the Arjuna Award on him for his achievements in the sport. He is employed as a Deputy Commissioner of Police in his native State of Haryana. On 19 December 2018, he announced his retirement from kabbadi.

Early life
Kumar, born and brought up in Palra, Gurgaon, Haryana, is the son of Ransingh Yadav, and Ballo Devi. He started playing Kabaddi as a pastime during his schooldays. In April 2005, he joined CRPF as a constable.  He represented India for the first time at the 2006 South Asian Games in Sri Lanka.

Pro Kabaddi League

U Mumba

2014 
He was captain of the U Mumba team in the 2014 Pro Kabaddi League. He won the Most Valuable Player award in the first season of the league, leading his team to the finals where they lost to Jaipur Pink Panthers. He scored 155 raid points in 16 matches, to become one of the most successful raider of Pro Kabaddi.

2015 
He led U Mumba to their maiden Pro Kabaddi title in 2015 in which he finished the season with 74 raid points. They defeated Bengaluru Bulls in the final.

2016 
U Mumba reached the final where they lost against Patna Pirates by a margin of only 2 points. This was the third time when they played the final. A player in his team, Rishank Devadiga, got the award of the most valuable player.

He was retained by U Mumba team. After 3 seasons, the squad of U Mumba was mostly changed but once again with the help of Rakesh Kumar they managed to finish fifth in the season. This was the first season where U Mumba failed to reach the finals.

2017
Anup Kumar was retained by 
Mumba for the fifth consecutive season. In season 5, he became the first player in Pro Kabaddi to complete 400 raid points.

Jaipur Pink Panthers

2018–19 
For the sixth season, Anup Kumar was released by his former franchise U Mumba. In the auctions, Abhishek Bachchan owned franchise Jaipur Pink Panthers brought him in the auction for 30 Lakhs INR.

Retierment 
On 19 December 2018, he announced his retirement from kabaddi after completing 15 years in the sport.

Coaching 
Currently, he is the coach of Puneri Paltan in Pro Kabbadi League Season 7.

International career
He made his International debut in 2006 South Asian Games. Anup Kumar won gold medals at the 2010 Asian Games and the 2014 Asian Games in kabaddi.

He won a gold medal in kabaddi at the 2016 South Asian Games.

He captained the Indian national Kabaddi team and won their record third Kabaddi World Cup in 2016.

Style of play 
His main skills are bonus, hand touch and toe touch. Due to his extraordinary skills of taking bonus points, he is famously known as Bonus ka Badshah. He has another nickname 'Captain Cool' due to his brilliant captaincy and sportsmanship. He is widely regarded as one of the greatest captains in Indian Kabaddi history.

Though there was a decline in his performance at the final stages (during last matches), he continued to influence by his captainship qualities.

Honours and achievements

Club

U Mumba 
Pro Kabaddi League:
2015 Pro Kabaddi League Champions with U Mumba as a captain.
2014 Pro Kabaddi League- Raider of the season with 153 raid points from 16 matches

International

India 
 Kabaddi World Cup: 2016
 Asian Games Gold Medal: 2010, 2014
 South Asian Games Gold Medal: 2016

Individual

Awards 
 Pro Kabaddi League 2014: Most Valuable Player
 Arjuna Award for Kabaddi: 2012

References

External links
 Official Twitter

Indian kabaddi players
1983 births
Living people
People from Gurgaon district
Kabaddi players from Haryana
Pro Kabaddi League players
Recipients of the Arjuna Award
Asian Games gold medalists for India
Asian Games medalists in kabaddi
Kabaddi players at the 2010 Asian Games
Kabaddi players at the 2014 Asian Games
Medalists at the 2010 Asian Games
Medalists at the 2014 Asian Games
South Asian Games gold medalists for India
South Asian Games medalists in kabaddi